Jimmy O'Brien may refer to:

 Jimmy O'Brien (hurler), Irish hurler
 Jimmy O'Brien (rugby union), Irish rugby union player
 Jomboy (sports media), YouTuber who is named Jimmy O'Brien